Swiftwater Inn was a historic inn and tavern located in Pocono Township, Monroe County, Pennsylvania.  It was originally built in 1778, and was a three-story building with a gambrel roof. It had a two-story front verandah.  The building had various additions built in the mid- to late-19th century.

It was added to the National Register of Historic Places in 1976.  It was delisted in 2010 after being demolished in 2007 as structurally unsound.

References

Hotel buildings on the National Register of Historic Places in Pennsylvania
Hotel buildings completed in 1778
Buildings and structures in Monroe County, Pennsylvania
National Register of Historic Places in Monroe County, Pennsylvania